Esporte Clube Democrata, usually known simply as Democrata de Governador Valadares, Democrata-GV, or just Democrata, is a traditional Brazilian football club from Governador Valadares, Minas Gerais state.

History
Dissatisfied supporters of Flamengo of Figueira do Rio Doce (old name of Governador Valadares city) founded a new club, named São Domingos de Figueira do Rio Doce on 13 February 1932. Soon later the club was renamed to its current name, Esporte Clube Democrata. Democrata won in 1981 its first title, the Minas Gerais Cup.

Achievements

 Taça Minas Gerais:
 Winners (1): 1981
 Campeonato Mineiro Módulo II:
 Winners (1): 2005, 2016
 Campeonato do Interior de Minas Gerais:
 Winners (5): 1991, 1992, 1993, 1994, 2007
 Troféu Inconfidência:
 Winners (1): 2022

Current squad

First Team

Stadium
Democrata's stadium is Estádio José Mammoud Abbas, usually known as Mamudão, inaugurated in 1964, with a maximum capacity of 15,000 people.

References

External links
 Official site
 Esporte Clube Democrata at Templos do Futebol

 
Association football clubs established in 1932
Football clubs in Minas Gerais
1932 establishments in Brazil